Yevhen Vitaliyovych Baryshnikov (born 1 August 1988) is a Ukrainian football manager and retired defensive midfielder.

Career
For a long time played for reserve or youth teams.

External links 
 Official Website Profile
 

1988 births
Living people
Footballers from Dnipro
Ukrainian footballers
Ukraine under-21 international footballers
Ukraine youth international footballers
Ukrainian football managers
FC Dnipro players
FC Naftovyk-Ukrnafta Okhtyrka players
FC Kryvbas Kryvyi Rih players
Ukrainian Premier League players
Ukrainian First League players
Association football midfielders